Philip Michael Heise (born 20 June 1991) is a German professional footballer who plays as a left-back for  club Karlsruher SC.

Club career
Heise began his career with the second team at Fortuna Düsseldorf in the 2010–11 season. After two seasons at Preußen Münster he joined FC Heidenheim in the summer of 2013. For the 2015–16 season Heise moved to VfB Stuttgart. He joined Dynamo Dresden on 10 January 2017.

On 31 January 2019, Heise left Dynamo Dresden to join EFL Championship side Norwich City, who were promoted to the Premier League as champions at the end of the season. He made his debut for Norwich in an EFL Cup tie against Crawley Town on 27 August 2019.

On 4 January 2020, Heise joined 1. FC Nürnberg on loan for the rest of the 2019–20 season.

On 18 August he joined Karlsruher SC on loan.

Career statistics

References

External links

Living people
1991 births
Association football fullbacks
German footballers
Fortuna Düsseldorf players
SC Preußen Münster players
1. FC Heidenheim players
VfB Stuttgart players
Dynamo Dresden players
Norwich City F.C. players
Karlsruher SC players
Bundesliga players
2. Bundesliga players
3. Liga players
Footballers from Düsseldorf